Bsquare is an Internet of Things (IoT) systems software provider, technology distributor, and system integrator headquartered in Seattle, Washington that supports OEMs, ODMs, and enterprises with OS licenses, device management, and professional development services. Bsquare is listed on the NASDAQ exchange. As of 2015, the company has approximately 250 employees worldwide.

History
Bsquare was founded in 1994 by William and Elizabeth Baxter.

In 2008, Bsquare acquired TestQuest, expanding the company's testing automation capabilities.

In 2011, Bsquare acquired British-based company MPC Data Limited, expanding into the software sector in the United Kingdom and Europe.

Industry services and products
Bsquare provides B2B technology products and services. Their primary focus is SquareOne, a device management suite of software and services that supports intelligent IoT operations. Bsquare is also an Amazon Web Services (AWS) Technology Partner and utilises AWS services alongside services developed in-house.

Bsquare also provides hardware engineering, platform software development, application development, quality assurance and testing, licensing services, training and support. Supported operating systems include Android, iOS, Linux and Windows IoT.

Global locations

References

External links
 TMCnet.com, June 30, 2011 - Microsoft News - BSQUARE Enters 13th Year as Embedded OEM Distributor of Microsoft
 Thinq.co.UK, May 31, 2011 – Hands-on with the Qualcomm Dragonboard dev kit
 Puget Sound Business Journal, May 27, 2011 – 4 companies mining smartphone gold
 iPhone Development Talk, May 29, 2011 – BSQUARE helps iPhone Developers to distribute content across various devices
 The Wall Street Journal, May 18, 2011 – BSQUARE Announces Distribution and Support for Adobe Reader Mobile SDK
 Bellevue Reporter, March 17, 2011 – Bellevue firm helps develop new soda dispenser
 Puget Sound Business Journal, February 9, 2011 – Bsquare-Ford extend deal through 2011

Technology companies of the United States
Companies listed on the Nasdaq